Portrait Salon is a competition that aims to show the best of the rejected photographs from the juried Taylor Wessing Photographic Portrait Prize. A judge is usually invited to make the selection and the work is shown in a number of exhibitions and in an accompanying catalogue. It was founded in 2011 by Carole Evans and James O Jenkins.

The portrait photography competition took place in 2011, 2012, 2013, 2014, 2015, 2016, 2017, 2018 (when it also accepted rejections from the Portrait of Britain competition), and 2019.

Publications
Portrait Salon '11. 2011. Newspaper format.
Portrait Salon '12. 2012. Newspaper format.
Portrait Salon '13. 2013. Newspaper format.
Portrait Salon '14. 2014. Newspaper format.
Portrait Salon '15. 2015. Newspaper format.
Portrait Salon '16. 2016.
Portrait Salon '18. 2018. Pack of cards format.
Portrait Salon '19. 2019.

See also
Salon des Refusés

References

External links

Annual events in the United Kingdom
Awards established in 2011
Photography awards
Photography in the United Kingdom